Upper Silver Lake is a  lake located in Waterford Township, Michigan in Oakland County, Michigan.

The  is located south of Walton Blvd. and east of Silver Lake Road.

Upper Silver Lake is part of the Clinton River watershed. It connects with  Silver Lake to the west.

On the southeastern shore of Upper Silver Lake is Pontiac, Michigan's Hawthorne Park.

Fish
Upper Silver Lake fish include bluegill and largemouth bass. Pike

References

Lakes of Oakland County, Michigan
Lakes of Michigan
Lakes of Waterford Township, Michigan